John Kenyon Vaughan-Morgan, Baron Reigate,  (2 February 1905 – 26 January 1995), known as Sir John Vaughan-Morgan, Bt, between 1960 and 1970, was a British Conservative Party politician.

Family and early life
Vaughan-Morgan was the younger son of Sir Kenyon Pascoe Vaughan-Morgan, an army officer and Conservative member of parliament.  His great-uncle was the Liberal politician Octavius Vaughan Morgan. He was educated at Eton College and Christ Church, Oxford.

Career
In 1928 he entered politics when he was elected to Chelsea Borough Council in London, and was chairman of East Fulham Conservative Association, the constituency previously represented by his father, from 1935 to 1938.

In 1940 he married Emily Cross of New York City. The Second World War had broken out in 1939, and shortly after his marriage Vaughan-Morgan enlisted in the Welsh Guards. He spent the next five years in continuous active service outside the United Kingdom, ending the war as a staff officer for the 21st Army Group.

After the war he was elected to the London County Council to represent Chelsea in 1946, remaining on the council until 1952. At the 1950 general election he was elected to the Commons as Member of Parliament for Reigate in Surrey, holding the seat for twenty years until his retirement at the 1970 election. In 1957, he was Parliamentary Secretary to the Ministry of Health, and a Minister of State at the Board of Trade from 1957 to 1959. Following the 1959 general election he returned to the backbenches.

Honours and arms
He was created a baronet, of Outwood in the County of Surrey, in the New Year Honours 1960 "for political and public services", and was appointed to the Privy Council in the 1961 Birthday Honours.

Following his retirement from the Commons, he was created a life peer as  Baron Reigate, of Outwood in the County of Surrey on 2 July 1970. A director of a number of companies based in the City of London, he served as Master of the Worshipful Company of Merchant Taylors in 1970. He was also Chairman of the Board of Westminster Hospital from 1963 to 1974. in 1971 he was made an honorary freeman of the Borough of Reigate. He died one week before his 90th birthday.

References

Sources

External links
 
 Catalogue of the Reigate papers held at LSE Archives

1905 births
1995 deaths
Baronets in the Baronetage of the United Kingdom
Reigate
Conservative Party (UK) MPs for English constituencies
UK MPs 1950–1951
UK MPs 1951–1955
UK MPs 1955–1959
UK MPs 1959–1964
UK MPs 1964–1966
UK MPs 1966–1970
UK MPs who were granted peerages
Members of London County Council
Members of Chelsea Metropolitan Borough Council
People educated at Eton College
Alumni of Christ Church, Oxford
Welsh Guards officers
Members of the Privy Council of the United Kingdom
Ministers in the Macmillan and Douglas-Home governments, 1957–1964
Life peers created by Elizabeth II